Executive Protection (meaning "The Bodyguards") is a Swedish action film from 2001 directed by Anders Nilsson. It is the second film in the series about police officer Johan Falk (Jakob Eklund).

Plot summary

Sven Persson (Samuel Fröler), who owns a textile company in Estonia, hires Nikolaus Lehman (Christoph M. Ohrt) to take care of local gangsters who are attempting to pressure Persson into paying 'protection' money. To Persson's surprise and shock, Lehman takes care of the problem by killing the gangsters and demands a share of the company's profit. A threatened Persson seeks out his old friend and police officer Johan Falk (Jakob Eklund), who has been assigned a desk job as a disciplinary action by his superiors.

Falk realizes that the police can't do anything to protect Persson and his family, and seeks out a security company run by Mårtenson (Krister Henriksson) and Pernilla (Alexandra Rapaport). They agree to help Persson and Falk is offered a job at the company, which he quickly accepts.

Cast (partial) 
Jakob Eklund as Johan Falk
Samuel Fröler as Sven Persson
Alexandra Rapaport as Pernilla
Lia Boysen as Jeanette Persson, Sven Persson's wife
Christoph M. Ohrt as Nikolaus Lehman
Marie Richardson as Helén, Johan Falk's girlfriend
Krister Henriksson as Mårtenson
Fredrik Dolk as Kroon

External links

2001 films
Police detective films
Swedish detective films
Swedish action thriller films
2001 action thriller films
2000s Swedish-language films
2000s Swedish films